Campeonato Mato-Grossense Second Division is the second level of the football league of the State of Mato Grosso, Brazil. It is organized by the Mato Grosso State Football Federation.

Participants
2022 edition

List of champions

Titles by team

Teams in bold stills active.

By city

References

 
Matogrossense
Football in Mato Grosso